Eilema peperita is a moth of the subfamily Arctiinae. It was described by George Hampson in 1901. It is found in the Democratic Republic of the Congo, Kenya and Tanzania.

References

 

peperita
Moths described in 1901